Upper Uwchlan Township is a township in Chester County, Pennsylvania. The population was 11,227 at the 2010 census. The township included the community of Milford Mills before it was inundated by the creation of the Marsh Creek Dam in 1972.

The main population center of the township has grown surrounding the historic Eagle Tavern at the intersection of Route 100 and Little Conestoga Road.  This major unincorporated community is known as the village of Eagle, but also sometimes known as Uwchlan.  That is the address of the local post office.

History
The Byers Station Historic District, West Vincent Highlands Historic District, Larkin Covered Bridge, and Wheelen House are listed on the National Register of Historic Places.

Geography

Demographics
At the 2010 census, the township was 80.8% non-Hispanic White, 1.4% Black or African American, 14.1% Asian, and 1.3% were two or more races. 2.4% of the population were of Hispanic or Latino ancestry.

As of the census, of 2000, there were 6,850 people, 2,132 households, and 1,874 families residing in the township.  The population density was 637.2 people per square mile (246.0/km).  There were 2,167 housing units at an average density of 201.6/sq mi (77.8/km).  The racial makeup of the township was 97.40% White, 0.70% African American, 0.06% Native American, 1.12% Asian, 0.20% from other races, and 0.51% from two or more races. Hispanic or Latino of any race were 0.96% of the population.

There were 2,132 households, out of which 55.0% had children under the age of 18 living with them, 81.7% were married couples living together, 4.5% had a female householder with no husband present, and 12.1% were non-families. 9.7% of all households were made up of individuals, and 1.8% had someone living alone who was 65 years of age or older.  The average household size was 3.21 and the average family size was 3.46.

In the township the population was spread out, with 35.0% under the age of 18, 4.8% from 18 to 24, 32.5% from 25 to 44, 23.7% from 45 to 64, and 4.0% who were 65 years of age or older.  The median age was 35 years. For every 100 females, there were 100.1 males.  For every 100 females age 18 and over, there were 97.7 males.

The median income for a household in the township was $96,711, and the median income for a family was $101,895. Males had a median income of $76,206 versus $37,404 for females. The per capita income for the township was $33,256.  About 2.0% of families and 2.5% of the population were below the poverty line, including 3.8% of those under age 18 and 6.7% of those age 65 or over.

Education
It is in the Downingtown Area School District.

Residents are within the Brandywine-Wallace, Pickering Valley, Shamona Creek, and Springton Manor elementary boundaries. The township is divided into two secondary boundaries: Downingtown Middle School and Downingtown West High School, and Lionville Middle School and Downingtown East High School.

St. Elizabeth School of the Roman Catholic Archdiocese of Philadelphia is in the township.

Windsor Christian Academy is in the township.

Transportation

The Pennsylvania Turnpike (I-76) is the most prominent highway serving Upper Uwchlan Township. It follows a northwest-southeast alignment through the center of the township. Pennsylvania Route 100 follows the Pottstown Pike along a north-south alignment through the east and northeast portion of the township. Pennsylvania Route 401 follows Conestoga Road along a northwest-southeast alignment across the northeastern corner of the township.

Places of worship
Windsor Baptist Church, founded in 1833 is located in the township at 213 Little Conestoga Road, in the village of Eagle. Saint Elizabeth, a Catholic church, is located at 100 Fellowship Road, at Pottstown Pike. Just south of it, on Pottstown Pike, is Beth Israel Congregation of Chester County (founded 1904), Upper Uwchlan's only synagogue.

See also 
 Welsh Tract

References

External links

 Upper Uwchlan Township

Townships in Chester County, Pennsylvania
Townships in Pennsylvania